The International Lyme and Associated Diseases Society (ILADS, pronounced ) is a non-profit advocacy group which advocates for greater acceptance of the controversial and unrecognized diagnosis "chronic Lyme disease". ILADS was formed by advocates for the recognition of "chronic Lyme disease" including physicians, patients and laboratory personnel, and has published alternative treatment guidelines and diagnostic criteria due to the disagreement with mainstream consensus medical views on Lyme disease.

ILADS sustains the controversy as to the existence of "chronic Lyme disease", including advocating for long-term antibiotic treatment, but the existence of persistent borrelia infection is not supported by high quality clinical evidence, and the use of long term antibiotics is dangerous and contradicted.  Major US medical authorities, including the Infectious Diseases Society of America, the American Academy of Neurology, and the National Institutes of Health, are careful to distinguish the diagnosis and treatment of "patients who have had well-documented Lyme disease and who remain symptomatic for many months to years after completion of appropriate antibiotic therapy" from patients who have not had well-documented Lyme disease; the consensus accepts the existence of post–Lyme disease symptoms in a minority of patients who have had Lyme.  The consensus rejects long-term antibiotic treatment even for these patients, as entailing too much risk and lacking sufficient efficacy to subject patients to the risks.  The consensus calls for more research into understanding the pathologies that afflict patients with post-Lyme syndrome and into better treatments.

A 2004 article in the Pediatric Infectious Disease Journal on the prevalence of inaccurate online information about Lyme disease cited the ILADS website as a source of such inaccurate material.

References

External links 
 International Lyme and Associated Diseases Society website

Lyme disease